Dimitrije Stefanović (21 January 1896 – 5 December 1991) was a Yugoslav long-distance runner. He competed in the marathon at the 1928 Summer Olympics.

References

1896 births
1991 deaths
Athletes (track and field) at the 1928 Summer Olympics
Yugoslav male long-distance runners
Yugoslav male marathon runners
Olympic athletes of Yugoslavia
Athletes from Budapest